Sergio Pagni (born 26 March 1979), is an athlete from Lucca, Italy, who competes in compound archery. He has won gold medals at the World Archery Championships, World Cup, Universiade and European Championships and is a former world number one archer.

References

External links

 

1979 births
Living people
Italian male archers
World Archery Championships medalists
World Games silver medalists
Universiade medalists in archery
Competitors at the 2013 World Games
Universiade gold medalists for Italy
European Games competitors for Italy
Archers at the 2019 European Games
Medalists at the 2005 Summer Universiade